Zwarthoed is a Dutch surname. Notable people with the surname include:

Julie Zwarthoed (born 1994), Dutch ice hockey player
Theo Zwarthoed (born 1982), Dutch footballer

Dutch-language surnames